Elmer Elbert Barlow (May 18, 1887 – June 26, 1948) was an American jurist from Wisconsin.

Born in Arcadia, Wisconsin, Barlow received his bachelor's and law degrees from the University of Wisconsin. He practiced law in La Crosse, Wisconsin and then was appointed executive counsel to the Governor of Wisconsin. In 1945, Barlow was elected to the Wisconsin Supreme Court. He died in office in 1948.

Notes

People from Arcadia, Wisconsin
Politicians from La Crosse, Wisconsin
University of Wisconsin–Madison alumni
University of Wisconsin Law School alumni
Justices of the Wisconsin Supreme Court
1887 births
1948 deaths
20th-century American judges